Bolton (locally  ) is a town in Greater Manchester in North West England, formerly a part of Lancashire. A former mill town, Bolton has been a production centre for textiles since Flemish weavers settled in the area in the 14th century, introducing a wool and cotton-weaving tradition. The urbanisation and development of the town largely coincided with the introduction of textile manufacture during the Industrial Revolution. Bolton was a 19th-century boomtown and, at its zenith in 1929, its 216 cotton mills and 26 bleaching and dyeing works made it one of the largest and most productive centres of cotton spinning in the world. The British cotton industry declined sharply after the First World War and, by the 1980s, cotton manufacture had virtually ceased in Bolton.

It is surrounded by several neighbouring towns and villages that together form the Metropolitan Borough of Bolton, of which Bolton is the administrative centre. The town of Bolton has a population of 139,403, whilst the wider metropolitan borough has a population of 262,400. Bolton originated as a small settlement in the moorland known as Bolton le Moors. In the English Civil War, the town was a Parliamentarian outpost in a staunchly Royalist region and, as a result, was stormed by 3,000 Royalist troops led by Prince Rupert of the Rhine in 1644. In what became known as the Bolton Massacre, 1,600 residents were killed and 700 were taken prisoner.

Bolton Wanderers football club play home games at the University of Bolton Stadium and the WBA World light-welterweight champion Amir Khan was born in the town. Cultural interests include the Octagon Theatre and the Bolton Museum and Art Gallery, as well as one of the earliest public libraries established after the Public Libraries Act 1850.

History

Toponymy
Bolton is a common Northern English name derived from the Old English -, meaning a settlement with a dwelling. The first recorded use of the name, in the form Boelton, dates from 1185 to describe Bolton le Moors, though this may not be in relation to a dwelling. It was recorded as Bothelton in 1212, Botelton in 1257, Boulton in 1288, and Bolton after 1307.
Later forms of Botheltun were Bodeltown, Botheltun-le-Moors, Bowelton, Boltune, Bolton-super-Moras, Bolton-in-ye-Moors, Bolton-le-Moors.
The town's motto of  means "overcome difficulties" (or "delays"), and is a pun on the Bolton-super-Moras version of the name meaning literally, "Bolton on the moors". The name itself is referred to in the badge of the Bolton Metropolitan Borough Council using a form of visual pun, a rebus, in combining motifs of arrow for 'bolt' and heraldic crown for 'tun', the term for the central high point of a defensive position that is the etymon of the suffix of Bolton.

Early history to the Civil War
There is evidence of human existence on the moors around Bolton since the early part of the Bronze Age, including a stone circle on Cheetham Close above Egerton, and Bronze Age burial mounds on Winter Hill. A Bronze Age mound was excavated in Victorian times outside Haulgh Hall. The Romans built roads from Manchester to Ribchester to the east and a road along what is now the A6 to the west. It is claimed that Agricola built a fort at Blackrod by clearing land above the forest. Evidence of a Saxon settlement exists in the form of religious objects found when the Victorian parish church was built.

In 1067 Great Bolton was the property of Roger de Poitou and after 1100, of Roger de Meresheys. Bolton became the property of the Pilkington family until they forfeited the land in the War of the Roses. The land was given to the Stanley family and thus the  Earls of Derby who became royalists in the English civil war. The area surrounding Bolton was subsequently divided into four parts including the Stanley family, the Earl of Bradford, a Freeman and various other parties. Great Bolton and Little Bolton were part of the Marsey fee, in 1212 Little Bolton was held by Roger de Bolton as plough-land, by the service of the twelfth part of a knight's fee to Randle de Marsey. The parish church in Bolton has an early foundation although the exact date is unknown; it was given by the lord of the manor to the Gilbertine canons of Mattersey Priory in Nottinghamshire, founded by Roger de Marsey.

A charter to hold a market in Churchgate was granted on 14 December 1251 by King Henry III of England. Bolton became a market town and borough by a charter from the Earl of Derby, William de Ferrers, on 14 January 1253, and a market was held until the 18th century. Burgage plots were laid out on Churchgate and Deansgate in the centre of the medieval town close to where Ye Olde Man & Scythe public house, dating from 1251, is situated today.
In 1337 Flemish weavers settled and introduced the manufacture of woollen cloth. More Flemish weavers, fleeing the Huguenot persecutions, settled here in the 17th century. The second wave of settlers wove fustian, a rough cloth made of linen and cotton. Digging sea coal was recorded in 1374. There was an outbreak of the plague in the town in 1623.

During the English Civil War, the people of Bolton were Puritans and supported the Parliamentarian cause. A parliamentary garrison in the town was attacked twice without success but on 28 May 1644 Prince Rupert's Royalist army with troops under the command of the Earl of Derby attacked again. The attack became known as the Bolton Massacre in which 1,500 died, 700 were taken prisoner and the town plundered. The attackers took to referring to the town as the "Geneva of the North", referencing Geneva's dominant Calvinism, although historian Malcolm Hardman says this was a description borne "more of irritation than accuracy". At the end of the Civil War, Lord Derby was tried as a traitor at Chester and condemned to death. When his appeal for pardon to parliament was rejected he attempted to escape but was recaptured and executed for his part in the massacre outside Ye Olde Man & Scythe Inn on 15 October 1651.

Industrial revolution onward

Bolton was a 19th-century boomtown and, at its zenith in 1929, its 216 cotton mills and 26 bleaching and dyeing works made it one of the largest and most productive centres of cotton spinning in the world. The British cotton industry declined sharply after the First World War and, by the 1980s, cotton manufacture had virtually ceased in Bolton.

A tradition of cottage spinning and weaving and improvements to spinning technology by local inventors, Richard Arkwright and Samuel Crompton, led to rapid growth of the textile industry in the 19th century. Crompton, whilst living at Hall i' th' Wood, invented the spinning mule in 1779. Streams draining the surrounding moorland into the River Croal provided the water necessary for the bleach works that were a feature of this area. Bleaching using chlorine was introduced in the 1790s by the Ainsworths at Halliwell Bleachworks. Bolton and the surrounding villages had more than thirty bleachworks including the Lever Bank Bleach Works in the Irwell Valley. The mule revolutionised cotton spinning by combining the roller drafting of Arkwright's water frame with the carriage drafting and spindle tip twisting of James Hargreaves's spinning jenny, producing a high quality yarn. Self-acting mules were used in Bolton mills until the 1960s producing fine yarn. The earliest mills were situated by the streams and river as at Barrow Bridge, but steam power led to the construction of the large multi-storey mills and their chimneys that dominated Bolton's skyline, some of which survive today.

Growth of the textile industry was assisted by the availability of coal in the area. By 1896 John Fletcher had coal mines at Ladyshore in Little Lever; The Earl of Bradford had a coal mine at Great Lever; the Darcy Lever Coal Company had mines at Darcy Lever and there were coal mines at Tonge, Breightmet, Deane and Doffcocker. Some of these pits were close to the Manchester Bolton & Bury Canal providing the owners with markets in Bolton and Manchester. Coal mining declined in the 20th century.

Important transport links contributed to the growth of the town and the textile industry; the Manchester Bolton & Bury Canal constructed in 1791, connected the town to Bury and Manchester providing transport for coal and other basic materials. The Bolton and Leigh Railway, the oldest in Lancashire, opened to goods traffic in 1828 and Great Moor Street station opened to passengers in 1831. The railway initially connected Bolton to the Leeds and Liverpool Canal in Leigh, an important link with the port of Liverpool for the import of raw cotton from America, but was extended in 1829 to link up with the Manchester to Liverpool Line. Local firms built locomotives for the railway, in 1830 "Union" was built by Rothwell, Hick and Company and two locomotives, "Salamander" and "Veteran" were built by Crook and Dean.

Bolton's first Mayor, Charles James Darbishire was sympathetic to Chartism and a supporter of the Anti-Corn Law League. In August 1839 Bolton was besieged by Chartist rioters and the Riot Act was read and special constables sworn in. The mayor accompanied soldiers called to rescue special constables at Little Bolton Town Hall, which was besieged by a mob, and the incident ended without bloodshed. Derby Barracks was established in Fletcher Street in the early 1860s.

One of two statues prominent on Victoria Square near Bolton Town Hall is that of Samuel Taylor Chadwick (1809 – 3 May 1876) a philanthropist who donated funds to Bolton Hospital to create an ear, nose and throat ward.  Built houses for people living in cellars, through Bolton Council fought for better public health including cleaner water, established the Chadwick Orphanage, improved the Bolton Workhouse and funded the towns natural history museum that was the basis of the present Bolton Museum at Le Mans Crescent, the original museum was in a building at Queens Park. The second statue at Victoria Square is in memory of a former Bolton Mayor Sir Benjamin Alfred Dobson (1847–1898) who died in office in 1898, he was a textile machinery manufacturer and chairman of Dobson & Barlow, a significant employer in the town. By 1900 Bolton was Lancashire's third largest engineering centre after Manchester and Oldham. About 9,000 men were employed in the industry, half of them working for Dobson and Barlow in Kay Street.

Another engineering company Hick, Hargreaves & Co based at the Soho Foundry made Lancashire boilers and heavy machinery. Thomas Ryder and Son of Turner Bridge manufactured machine tools for the international motor industry. Wrought iron was produced for more than 100 years at Thomas Walmsley and Sons' Atlas Forge.

By 1911 the textile industry in Bolton employed about 36,000 people.  As of 1920, the Bolton Cardroom Union had more than 15,000 members, while the Bolton Weavers' Association represented 13,500 workers. The last mill to be constructed was Sir John Holden's Mill in 1927. The cotton industry declined from the 1920s. A brief upturn after the Second World War was not sustained, and the industry had virtually vanished by the end of the 20th century.

During the night of 26 September 1916, Bolton was the target for an aerial offensive. L21, a Zeppelin commanded by Oberleutnant Kurt Frankenburg of the Imperial German Navy, dropped twenty-one bombs on the town, five of them on the working class area of Kirk Street, killing thirteen residents and destroying six houses. Further attacks followed on other parts of the town, including three incendiaries dropped close to the Town Hall.

Lord Leverhulme
In 1899 William Lever, Lord Leverhulme, bought Hall i'th' Wood as a memorial to Samuel Crompton inventor of the spinning mule. Lever restored the dilapidated building and presented it to the town in 1902, having turned it into a museum furnished with household goods typical of domestic family life in the 16th and 17th centuries. Lever re-endowed Bolton Schools, giving land and his house on Chorley New Road. In 1902 he gave the people of Bolton Lever Park at Rivington. In 1911, Lever consulted Thomas Mawson, landscape architect and lecturer in Landscape Design at the University of Liverpool, regarding town planning in Bolton. Mawson published "Bolton – a Study in Town Planning and Civic Art" and gave lectures entitled "Bolton Housing and Town Planning Society" which formed the basis of an illustrated book "Bolton – as it is and as it might be". In 1924, Leverhulme presented Bolton Council with an ambitious plan to rebuild the town centre based on Mawson's designs funded partly by himself. The council declined in favour of extending the town hall and building the civic centre.

Governance

Lying within the county boundaries of Lancashire, until the early 19th century, Great Bolton and Little Bolton were two of the eighteen townships of the ecclesiastical parish of Bolton le Moors. These townships were separated by the River Croal, Little Bolton on the north bank and Great Bolton on the south. Bolton Poor Law Union was formed on 1 February 1837. It continued using existing poorhouses at Fletcher Street and Turton but in 1856 started to build a new workhouse at Fishpool Farm in Farnworth. Townleys Hospital was built on the site which is now Royal Bolton Hospital.

In 1838 Great Bolton, most of Little Bolton and the Haulgh area of Tonge with Haulgh were incorporated under the Municipal Corporations Act 1835 as a municipal borough, the second to be created in England. Further additions were made adding part of Rumworth in 1872 and part of Halliwell in 1877. In 1889 Bolton was granted County Borough status and became self-governing and independent from Lancashire County Council jurisdiction. In 1898, the borough was extended further by adding the civil parishes of Breightmet, Darcy Lever, Great Lever, the rest of Halliwell, Heaton, Lostock, Middle Hulton, the rest of Rumworth which had been renamed Deane in 1894, Smithills, and Tonge plus Astley Bridge Urban District, and part of Over Hulton civil parish. The County Borough of Bolton was abolished in 1974 and became a constituent part of the Metropolitan Borough of Bolton in Greater Manchester. Bolton unsuccessfully applied for city status in 2011.

Bolton Metropolitan Borough Council is divided into twenty wards, each of which elects three councillors for a term of up to four years.

Under the Reform Act of 1832, a Parliamentary Borough was established. The Bolton constituency was represented by two Members of Parliament (MPs). The Parliamentary Borough continued until 1950 when it was abolished and replaced with two parliamentary constituencies, Bolton East and Bolton West, each with one Member of Parliament. In 1983 Bolton East was abolished and two new constituencies were created, Bolton North East, and Bolton South East covering most of the former Farnworth constituency. At the same time major boundary changes also took place to Bolton West, which took over most of the former Westhoughton constituency. Under the town twinning scheme the local council have twinned Bolton with Le Mans in France, since 1967, and Paderborn in Germany, since 1975.

It is surrounded by several neighbouring towns and villages that together form the Metropolitan Borough of Bolton, of which Bolton is the administrative centre. The town of Bolton has a population of 139,403, whilst the wider metropolitan borough has a population of 262,400.

Geography

The early name, Bolton le Moors, described the position of the town amid the low hills on the edge of the West Pennine Moors southeast of Rivington Pike (456 m). Bolton lies on relatively flat land on both sides of the clough or steep-banked valley through which the River Croal flows in a southeasterly direction towards the River Irwell. The geological formation around Bolton consists of sandstones of the Carboniferous series and Coal Measures; in the northern part of Bolton the lower Coal Measures are mixed with underlying Millstone Grit.

Climate in the Greater Manchester area is generally similar to the climate of England, although owing to protection from the mountains in North Wales it experiences slightly lower than average rainfall except during the summer months, when rainfall is higher than average. Bolton has mild differences between highs and lows, and there is adequate rainfall year-round.  The Köppen Climate Classification subtype for this climate is "Cfb" (Marine West Coast Climate/Oceanic climate).

Demography

At the time of the United Kingdom Census 2001, according to the Office for National Statistics, the Urban Subdivision of Bolton was part of the Greater Manchester Urban Area and had a total resident population of 139,403, of which 67,823 (48.7%) were male and 71,580 (51.3%) were female, living in 57,827 households. Its population density was 31.35 people per hectare compared with an average of 40.20 across the Greater Manchester Urban Area. The median age of the population was 35, compared with 36 within the Greater Manchester Urban Area and 37 across England and Wales.

The majority of the population of Bolton were born in England (87.10%); 2.05% were born elsewhere within the United Kingdom, 1.45% within the rest of the European Union, and 9.38% elsewhere in the world.

Data on religious beliefs across the town in the 2001 census show that 67.9% declared themselves to be Christian, 12.5% stated that they were Muslim, 8.6% said they held no religion, and 3.4% reported themselves as Hindu.

Population change

Economy

At the time of the 2001 Census, 56,390 people resident in Bolton were in employment. Of these, 21.13% worked in the wholesale and retail trade, including repair of motor vehicles; 18.71% worked within manufacturing industry; 11.00% worked within the health and social work sector and 6.81% were employed in the transport, storage and communication industries.

In the last quarter of the 20th century heavy industry was replaced by service-based activities including data processing, call centres, hi-tech electronics and IT companies. The town retains some traditional industries employing people in paper-manufacturing, packaging, textiles, transportation, steel foundries and building materials. Missiles were produced at the British Aerospace (BAe) factory in Lostock, now closed. The Reebok brand's European headquarters are located at the Reebok Stadium. Bolton is also the home of the family bakery, Warburtons, established in 1876 on Blackburn Road. On 13 February 2003, Bolton was granted Fairtrade Town status.

Bolton attracts visitors to its shopping centres, markets, public houses, restaurants and cafes in the town centre
as well retail parks and leisure facilities close to the town centre and in the surrounding towns and suburbs. Tourism plays a part in the economy, visitor attractions include Hall i' th' Wood, Smithills Hall and Country Park, Last Drop Village, Barrow Bridge and the Bolton Steam Museum.

There are several regeneration projects planned for Bolton over the next ten years, including Church Wharf by Ask Developments and Bluemantle and Merchant's Quarter by local developer Charles Topham group, which together will contribute  of business space. The Bolton Innovation Zone is a large £300 million development with the University of Bolton at its core.

Landmarks

Situated in the town centre on the site of a former market is the Grade II* listed town hall, an imposing neoclassical building designed by William Hill and opened in June 1873 by Albert Edward, Prince of Wales. In the 1930s the building was extended by Bradshaw Gass & Hope. Within the Town Hall are the 'Albert Halls and several function rooms. The original, single Albert Hall was destroyed by fire on 14 November 1981. After rebuilding work, it was replaced by the present Albert Halls, which were opened in 1985. The halls underwent a major restoration project, reopening in 2017.

The Great Hall of Smithills Hall was built in the 14th century when William de Radcliffe received the Manor of Smithills from the Hultons, the chapel dates from the 16th century and was extended during the 19th. Smithills Hall was where, in 1555, George Marsh was tried for heresy during the Marian Persecutions. After being "examined" at Smithills, according to local tradition, George Marsh stamped his foot so hard to re-affirm his faith, that a footprint was left in the stone floor. It is a Grade I listed building and is now a museum.

Hall i' th' Wood, now a museum, is a late mediaeval yeoman farmer's house built by Laurence Brownlow. Around 1637 it was owned by the Norris family, who added the stone west wing. In the 18th century it was divided up into tenements. Samuel Crompton lived and worked there. In the 19th century it deteriorated further until in 1895 it was bought by industrialist William Hesketh Lever, who restored it and presented it to Bolton Council in 1900.

Bolton's 26 conservation areas contain 700 listed buildings, many of which are in the town centre, and there is parkland including the Victorian Queen's Park, Leverhulme Park and other open spaces in the surrounding area. These include Le Mans Crescent, Ye Olde Man & Scythe, Little Bolton Town Hall, the Market Place, Wood Street and Holy Trinity Church. The Market Hall of 1854 is a Grade II listed building. Outside the town centre can be found Mere Hall, Firwood Fold, Haulgh Hall, Park Cottage, St Mary's Church, Deane, Lostock Hall Gatehouse and All Souls Church. Notable mills still overlooking parts of the town are Sir John Holden's Mill and Swan Lane Mills.

Most views northwards are dominated by Rivington Pike and the Winter Hill TV Mast on the West Pennine Moors above the town.

Transport
Bolton is well served by the local road network and national routes. The A6, a major north–south trunk road, passes to the west through Hunger Hill and Westhoughton.
The A666 dual carriageway, sometimes referred to as the Devil's Highway because of its numeric designation, is a spur from the M61/M60 motorway interchange through the town centre to Astley Bridge, Egerton, Darwen and Blackburn. The M61 has three dedicated junctions serving the borough.

A network of local buses coordinated by Transport for Greater Manchester serves the Bolton district and beyond; bus operators include Arriva North West and Diamond North West. Bolton is also served by the National Express coach network. The bus station on Moor Lane was scheduled to be replaced by a new interchange in the town centre next to the railway station by the end of 2014, at a cost of £48 million.

Bolton Interchange is managed by Northern; the railway station is part of a town centre transport interchange with services to Manchester, Wigan, Southport, Blackburn and intermediate stations operated by Northern and TransPennine Express.

Education

Bolton School, a private day school, was founded on a site next to the parish church in 1524 as a grammar school for boys; it merged around 1656 with a free grammar school (Lever's grammar) that had been founded shortly after 1641.  In 1898, it moved to its present site in Chorley New Road, and in 1913 merged with Bolton Girls' Day School. In 1855 the Bolton Church Institute was founded by Canon James Slade near to the parish church. The school became Canon Slade School, which has since relocated to Bradshaw. The town's other secondary schools include Bolton St Catherine's Academy, Ladybridge High School, Sharples School, Smithills School, Thornleigh Salesian College and University Collegiate School. Bolton College provides further education from sites throughout the borough. Bolton Sixth Form College comprises the Town Centre Campus and Farnworth Campus.  The Bolton TIC (Technical Innovation Centre), opened in 2006, supports local schools by providing additional technical training. The University of Bolton, formerly the Bolton Institute of Higher Education, gained university status in 2005.

Religion

There is evidence from Saxon times of Christian churches and at the time of the Civil War a Puritan and nonconformist presence in the town. The Unitarians were among the early dissenting congregations which eventually included Methodists, Baptists, Seventh Day Adventist and other denominations. More than forty churches were built during the Victorian era, but some have now been closed, demolished or converted to other uses.

Today, the parish of Bolton-le-Moors covers a small area in the town centre, but until the 19th century it covered a much larger area, divided into eighteen chapelries and townships. The neighbouring ancient parish of Deane centred around St Mary's Church once covered a large area to the west and south of Bolton, and the township of Great Lever was part of the ancient parish of Middleton.

The Church of St Peter, commonly known as Bolton Parish Church, is an example of the gothic revival style. The first church on the same site was built in Anglo-Saxon times. It was rebuilt in Norman times and again in the early 15th century. Little is known of the first two earlier churches, but the third building was a solid, squat building with a sturdy square tower at the west end. It was modified over the years until it fell into disrepair and was demolished in 1866. Fragments of stone and other artefacts from these first three buildings are displayed in the museum corner of the present church.

St Mary's Deane, once the only church in a parish of ten townships in the hundred of Salford, is a church established in Saxon times. The current building dates from 1250 with extensions and restoration in the 19th century and is a Grade II* listed building.

St George's Church was built between 1794 and 1796 when Little Bolton was a separate township. Built by Peter Rothwell and paid for by the Ainsworth family. in 1975 it was leased to Bolton Council, and became a craft centre in 1994. St Patrick's Roman Catholic Church on Great Moor Street, was built in 1861.

The New Zakaria Mosque, the first mosque in Bolton, served the Muslim community from Pakistan and India from the 1960s. The first place of worship for Hindus was in the former St Barnabus Church, converted into a Hindu temple.

Sport
Bolton Wanderers F.C. is an English Football League club which was formed in 1874 and for 102 years played at Burnden Park. The club moved to the University of Bolton Stadium in Horwich in 1997. The club has won four FA Cups, the most recent in 1958, and spent 73 seasons in the top division of the English league – more than any club never to have been league champions.

Bolton Hockey Club fields women's men's and junior teams and has more than 120 playing members.  The town has a local cricket leagues, the Bolton Cricket League, Bolton also has a rugby union club, Bolton RUFC formed in 1872 situated on Avenue Street. The club operates four senior teams, as well as women's and junior sections. Bolton Robots of Doom is a baseball club started in 2003, playing home games at Stapleton Avenue. In addition to the adult team there is a junior team, Bolton Bears. Baseball in Bolton dates back to 1938 with a team called Bolton Scarlets. An American football team, the Bolton Bulldogs, plays home games at Smithills School operating varsity and junior varsity teams.
Speedway racing, known as Dirt Track Racing, was staged at Raikes Park in the pioneering days of 1928, but the speedway was short-lived.
Greyhound racing took place at the Raikes Park Greyhound Stadium from 1927 until 1996.

Culture and society

According to a survey of the British Association for the Advancement of Science, Boltonians are the friendliest people in Britain. Humphrey Spender photographed Bolton calling it Worktown for the Mass-Observation Project, a social research organisation which aimed to record everyday life in Britain. His photographs provide a record of ordinary people living and working in a British pre-War industrial town.

Bolton has several theatres including the Octagon and independent groups such as Bolton Little Theatre and the Phoenix Theatre Company. Inside the Town Hall there is a theatre and conference complex, the Albert Halls. Le Mans Crescent, home to the central library, museum, art gallery, aquarium, magistrates' court and town hall, is to be the centre of a new Cultural Quarter. The library and museum are to be extended into the area now occupied by the Magistrates Court. Bolton Museum and Art Gallery houses a collection of local and international art. Bolton Steam Museum houses a variety of preserved steam engines in part of the old Atlas Mill.

Bolton Central Library was one of the earliest public libraries established after the Public Libraries Act 1850, opening in October 1853 in the Exchange Building on the old market square (Victoria Square) before moving to Le Mans Crescent in July 1938. The Bolton Symphony Orchestra performs regular concerts at the Albert Halls and Victoria Hall in the town centre.
The 2008 BBC Radio 3 Adult Choir of the Year and five times gold-medal winning barbershop chorus The Cottontown Chorus is based in Bolton.

The town's daily newspaper is The Bolton News, formerly the Bolton Evening News. There is a weekly free paper, the Bolton Journal and Bolton Council's monthly newspaper, Bolton Scene. The town is part of the BBC North West and ITV Granada television regions, served by the Winter Hill transmitter near Belmont. Local radio is provided by Greatest Hits Radio Greater Manchester (formerly Tower FM), which broadcasts across Bolton and Bury; Bolton FM began broadcasting in 2009.

The fictional village of Newbank in Benjamin Disraeli's novel Coningsby was based in part on the industrial village of Barrow Bridge. Spring and Port Wine by playwright, Bill Naughton was filmed and set in Bolton and The Family Way based on Naughton's play All in Good Time was also filmed and set in the town. Peter Kay filmed comedy TV series That Peter Kay Thing in the town.

Bolton has been used as a setting for film and television drama. Le Mans Crescent has featured as a London street in the Jeremy Brett version of Sherlock Holmes, a Russian secret service building in the 1990s comedy series Sleepers and in Peaky Blinders in 2014. The 1990s BBC drama Between the Lines filmed an episode in Victoria Square.

Bolton Community and Voluntary Services supports voluntary and community activities. A network of volunteer groups look after the environment in Bolton supported by Bolton Green Umbrella.

The first Bolton LGBT+ Pride was held in 2015 and has been an ongoing annual event which since its second year has included a parade and live music.

Public services

Bolton is policed by the Bolton Division of Greater Manchester Police.  The statutory emergency fire and rescue service is provided by the Greater Manchester Fire and Rescue Service, from Bolton Central, Bolton North, Horwich and Farnworth Fire Stations. Hospital services are provided by the Bolton NHS Foundation Trust, which provides Accident and Emergency and other services at Royal Bolton Hospital in Farnworth. Community health services, including GPs, district and community nurses, dentists and pharmacists, are co-ordinated by
the Bolton Primary Care Trust. Waste management is co-ordinated by the Greater Manchester Waste Disposal Authority. Bolton's Distribution Network Operator for electricity is Electricity North West Ltd. United Utilities manage Bolton's drinking and waste water.

Notable people

Among the notable people born in Bolton are the Protestant martyr George Marsh, 1515–55, the inventor of the spinning mule that revolutionised the textile industry, Samuel Crompton, 1753–1827, and industrialist Lord Leverhulme of Bolton-le-Moors, 1851–1925.

More recently, people born and raised in Bolton include Fred Dibnah, a steeplejack who became a popular television historian of Britain's industrial past; world champion boxer Amir Khan, who became the WBA World light-welterweight champion on 18 July 2009 at the age of 22, making him Britain's third-youngest world champion boxer; comedian Peter Kay; and president of the International Paralympic Committee Philip Craven. Playwright and author Bill Naughton was born in Ireland but brought up in Bolton from an early age.

See also

 List of mills in Bolton
 Listed buildings in Bolton

References

Citations

Bibliography

Further reading

External links

  Bolton Council

 
Towns in Greater Manchester
Market towns in Greater Manchester
Unparished areas in Greater Manchester
West Pennine Moors
Geography of the Metropolitan Borough of Bolton